Halifax County is a county in the Canadian province of Nova Scotia. The Municipality of the County of Halifax was the municipal government of Halifax County, apart from the separately incorporated towns and cities therein. The municipality was dissolved in 1996, together with those town and city governments, in their amalgamation into Halifax Regional Municipality.

History
Deriving its name from George Montagu-Dunk, 2nd Earl of Halifax (1716–1771), Halifax County was established by order-in-council on August 17, 1759. The boundaries of four other counties – Annapolis, Kings, Cumberland and Lunenburg – were specifically defined at that time, with Halifax County comprising all the part of peninsular Nova Scotia that was not within their limits.

Following the Seven Years' War, Cape Breton Island was formally annexed to Nova Scotia. For a time it formed part of Halifax County.

The boundaries of Halifax County were modified in 1822. That part of St. Mary's Township (established in 1818) which had been in Halifax County was annexed to and included within Sydney County.

The dividing line between the Districts of Halifax and Colchester was confirmed and established on May 3, 1828. In 1835, Halifax County was divided and the Counties of Colchester and Pictou County were created out of parts of what had previously been Halifax County. Eventually in 1880 the boundary between the Counties of Halifax and Colchester was fixed.

On April 1, 1996, Halifax County was dissolved and the Halifax Regional Municipality was created. The boundaries of the county and the regional municipality are the same. The county, however, also includes reserves of Cole Harbour, Sheet Harbour and Shubenacadie, parts of the Millbrook and Shubenacadie First Nations.

Halifax County continues to exist as a county in Nova Scotia, but all municipal government and service delivery is provided by either the Regional Municipality or the Indigenous Canadian Reserves, with no additional county level government or administration.

Communities 

Regional municipalities
Halifax Regional Municipality

Reserves
Beaver Lake 17
Cole Harbour 30
Sheet Harbour 36
Shubenacadie 13
Wallace Hills 14A

Demographics 

Notes

References 

 
Former county municipalities in Nova Scotia
States and territories disestablished in 1996
Populated places disestablished in 1996
States and territories established in 1759